Anisopodus consimilis is a species of beetle in the family Cerambycidae that was described by Per Olof Christopher Aurivillius in 1922.

References

Anisopodus
Beetles described in 1922